{{DISPLAYTITLE:C10H12ClNO2}}
The molecular formula C10H12ClNO2 (molar mass: 213.66 g/mol, exact mass: 213.0557 u) may refer to:

 Baclofen
 Chlorpropham (CIPC)

Molecular formulas